Patricia C. Zambryski is a plant scientist known for her work on Type IV secretion and cell-to-cell transport in plants. She was an elected member of the National Academy of Sciences, the American Association for the Advancement of Science, and the American Society for Microbiology.

Education and career 
Zambryski received her B.S. from McGill University in 1969, and earned a Ph.D. from the University of Colorado in 1974. As of 2022 she is professor emeritus at the University of California, Berkeley.

Research 
Zambryski is known for her work in the field of genetic engineering, specifically for her work with Agrobacterium tumefaciens, a bacterium she uses to track the molecular mechanisms that change plants and how plant cells communicate with each other. She has examined the structure of plant cells that have been altered by Agrobacterium tumefaciens. While working in Marc Van Montagu's lab, Zambryski determined how the Ti plasmid is identified by the bacterium, and she developed a vector that allowed the transfer of genetic material into a plant without altering the plant tissue. This advance was used to inject novel genes into plants. She has also examined plasmodesmata, which are the channels that reach across the spaces in plant cells.

Selected publications

Awards and honors 
In 2001 she was elected a member of the National Academy of Sciences and a fellow of the American Society for Microbiology. In 2010 she was elected a fellow of the American Association for the Advancement of Science.

References 

Living people
History of biotechnology
McGill University alumni
University of Colorado alumni
University of California, Berkeley faculty
Botanists
Geneticists
Women microbiologists
Year of birth missing (living people)